Territorial Assembly elections were held in French Upper Volta on 31 March 1957. The result was a victory for the Unified Democratic Party (an alliance of the Voltaic Democratic Union–African Democratic Rally and the Social Party for the Emancipation of the African Masses), which won 33 of the 68 seats in the Assembly.

Results

References

Elections in Burkina Faso
Upper Volta
Territorial Assembly election
Election and referendum articles with incomplete results
Upper Voltan Territorial Assembly election